The 2002 Mexican Figure Skating Championships took place in Puebla. Skaters competed in the disciplines of men's singles and ladies' singles on the senior level. The results were used to choose the Mexican teams to the 2002 World Championships and the 2002 Four Continents Championships.

Senior results

Men

Ladies

External links
 results

Mexican Figure Skating Championships, 2002
Mex
Figure Skating Championships, 2002
Fig
Mexican Figure Skating Championships